Lombardic or Langobardic is an extinct West Germanic language that was spoken by the Lombards, the Germanic people who settled in Italy in the sixth century. It was already declining by the seventh century because the invaders quickly adopted the Latin vernacular spoken by the local population. Many toponyms in modern Lombardy and Greater Lombardy (Northern Italy) and items of Lombard and broader Gallo-Italic vocabulary derive from Lombardic.

As a result, there are many aspects of the language about which nothing is known.

Classification
Lombardic is classified as part of the Elbe Germanic (Upper German) group  of West Germanic languages, most closely related to its geographical neighbours Alemannic and Bavarian. This is consistent with the accounts of classical historians, and indeed with the archaeological evidence of Langobardic settlement along the river Elbe.

In view of the lack of Lombardic texts and the narrow scope of the attested Lombardic vocabulary — almost entirely nouns in the nominative case and proper names — the classification rests entirely on phonology. Here the clear evidence of the Second Sound Shift shows that the language must be High German, rather than North Sea Germanic or East Germanic, as some earlier scholars proposed.

The Lombardic Corpus
The main evidence for Lombardic comes from contemporary documents written in Latin, where (a) individual Lombardic terms are cited and (b) people with Lombardic names are mentioned. There are also a small number of inscriptions, a handful of which use the Runic alphabet. Additional information about the vocabulary of Lombardic comes from later-attested loan words into Italian and its dialects, as well as a large number of Italian place names of Lombardic origin (see below).

The documentary sources fall into three categories:
 Lombardic law codes
 Narrative histories
 Administrative documents of the Lombard kingdom such as charters.

Phonology
Establishing sound values for Lombardic is problematic for two reasons. Where words are attested in contemporary Lombardic documents, scribes trained in Latin could not be expected to record accurately, or even consistently, the sounds of Lombardic. In the case of loanwords, these are often attested much later, by which time their form will have been affected not only by the adaptation to the phonology of the various Gallo-Italian dialects but also by subsequent sound changes in the development of Italian.

Vowels
The vowel system of Lombardic is very conservative and largely preserves the Proto-Germanic system. The three main vowel developments characteristic of other Upper German dialects are lacking in Lombardic.
There is no evidence of the Primary Umlaut of //, which is prevalent in Old High German (OHG), e.g. Lombardic  = OHG  ("champion").
 The diphthongs // and // are preserved, whereas in other Old High German dialects they become // and // or are monophthongized to // and // in certain phonetic contexts. Examples: Lgb.  = OHG  ("mayor"); Lgb.   = OHG  ("body snatching"); Lgb.  = OHG  ("payment").
 The mid long vowels // and //, which are diphthongized in OHG to // and // respectively, remain unchanged in Lombardic. Examples: Lgb.  = OHG  ("price"); Lgb.  = OHG  ("plough").

Consonants
Lombardic participated in and indeed shows some of the earliest evidence for the High German consonant shift. The term  (ablative) (the second element is cognate with English seat) in the Edictum Rothari shows the same shift. Many names in the Lombard royal families show shifted consonants, particularly  >  in the following name components:
 -bert > -pert: Aripert, Godepert
 -berg > -perg: Gundperga (daughter of King Agilulf)
 -brand > -prand: Ansprand, Liutprand

This sound change left two different sets of names in the Italian language:  (< Lombardic , "beam") vs.  (< Lombardic , "wood platform");  (< Lombardic ) vs.  (Lombardic , "bench").

Decline
It is not possible to say with certainty when the Lombardic language died out and there are divergent views on the issue. It seems certain that it was in decline even before the end of the Lombardic kingdom in 774, though it may have survived longer in Northern areas, with their denser Lombardic settlement. In any case, the Lombard host which had invaded Italy was not monolingual: in addition to a sizeable body of Saxons, there were also "Gepids, Bulgars, Sarmatians, Pannonians, Suevi, Noricans and so on" (Historia Langobardorum, II, 26).

In the areas of Italy settled by the Lombards, "there followed a rapid mixing of Roman and barbarian, especially among the population settled on the land." The Lombard conversion from Arianism to Roman Catholicism in the 7th century will have removed a major barrier to the integration of the two populations. By the 8th century speakers of Lombardic were bilingual, adopting the local Gallo-Italic language.

Even as use of the language declined, Lombardic personal names remained popular, though they gradually   lost their connection to the source language, adopting Latin endings. The 8th century also saw the development of hybrid names with both Lombardic and Latin elements (e.g. Alipertulus = Lgb  + Lat. ). By this time occurrence of both Lombardic and Latin names within a single family "is so widespread that such cases make up the majority throughout Lombard Italy".

Explicit evidence of the death of Lombardic comes in the late 10th century: the Salerno Chronicle mentions the "German language which the Lombards previously spoke" (cap. 38). But some knowledge of Lombardic remained: the Salerno chronicler nonetheless knows that the Lombardic term  includes an element which means "sitting". As late as 1003, a charter uses the Lombardic term  ("filthy fellow") as an insult.

Influence on Italian and Lombard

Loan words

At least 280 Italian words have been identified as Lombardic loans, though there is wide local variation and some are found only in areas settled by the Lombards. One problem in detecting Lombardic loans is that they are not always readily distinguishable from Gothic, the language of the previous Germanic rulers of Italy. In many cases, it is only evidence of the Second Sound Shift, which did not affect Gothic, that guarantees a Lombardic source for a loanword. However, the Sound Shift is equally present in Alemannic and Bavarian, which are also potential sources of loans into Northern Italian varieties at this period.

The main areas of the Lombardic vocabulary surviving in Italian are: warfare and weapons, the law, government and society, housebuilding and the household, objects and activities from daily life. Of these, however, Lombardic government and legal terms were to a great extent superseded by the Gallo-Roman vocabulary of the Frankish conquest. The predominance of loans relating to daily life "would appear to be a sign that the Longobards fitted in and integrated with the locals at a grass-roots level."

Examples:
 , "hip" < lgb. 
 , "knock" < lgb 
 , "blood feud" <lgb. 
 , "brace" < lgb.  "hook"
  "cheek", < lgb 
 , "owl" < lgb.  "cry out"
 , "fast" < lgb.  "cleverness"
 , "mud" < lgb. 
 , "knuckle" < lgb. 
 , "bench" < lgb. , 
 , "snore" < lgb. 
 , "scale, skin" < lgb. 
 , "jackdaw" < lgb  
 , "mop of hair" < lgb. .

The Lombard language is a distinct Romance language spoken in Northern Italy and Switzerland. It, too, has loans from Lombardic. The following examples come from Bergamasque, an Eastern Lombard dialect.

 , "chopped hay" < lgb.  ("flower")
 , "cultivated field" < lgb.  ("open plain")
 , "sour, unripe" < lgb. 
 , "stubborn" < lgb.  +  ("horse" + "bone/head")
 , "railing" < lgb.  ("bundle of branches")
 , it. , "chair" < lgb.  ("bench")
 , "to clean the house" < lgb.  ("to rub away").

Place names

When the Lombards settled in Italy they had no previous acquaintance with Latin, with the result that the earliest Lombard settlements received Lombardic names. There are a number of distinct types of name.

Each Lombard duke was the lord of a group of military clans, who were settled in the area he ruled.

Fara Filiorum Petri, Chieti, Abruzzo
Fara Gera d'Adda, Bergamo, Lombardy
Fara San Martino,  Chieti, Abruzzo
Fara in Sabina, Rieti, Lazio
Fara Novarese, Novara, Piedmont
Fara Olivana con Sola,  Bergamo, Lombardy
Fara Vicentino, Vicenza, Veneto
Farra d'Alpago, Belluno, Veneto
Farra di Soligo, Treviso, Veneto
Farra d'Isonzo, Gorizia, Friuli Venezia Giulia

Many settlements took their names from Lombardic personal names. For example the Lombardic name  ("spear") is the source of: Noci Garrioni (Cremona), Garin (Turin), Garini (Cuneo and Alessandria), Carengo (Novara), Ghiringhello (Verona), Gairilo (Brescia), Ghirla, (Verona), Garlasco (Pavia), Garleri (Porto Maurizio), and Garlazzolo (Pavia). Gamillscheg counts over 700 of these.

In many cases a Lombard personal name was appended to the Latin word for a natural feature.

Finally, there are over 30 Lombardic common nouns which have formed the basis for Italian place names, including:
Lgb.  ("mountain") > Berghi (Trient), Berga (Vicenza), Valperga (Turin)
Lgb.  ("mayor") > Scaldasole (Pavia), Casale di Scodosia (Padua)
Lgb.  ("stud farm") > Stoerda (Novara) (cf. Stuttgart).

Personal names
A number of Lombardic personal names survive in modern Italy (for example, Aldo), but where they have it is mostly in the form of a surname: Ansaldo, Grimaldi, Garibaldi, Landolfi, Pandolfi, Siccardi are all of Lombardic origin.

Sources

Latin
There are a number of Latin texts that include Lombardic names, and Lombardic legal texts contain terms taken from the legal vocabulary of the vernacular, including:
 Origo gentis Langobardorum (7th century)
 Paulus Diaconus, Historia Langobardorum 
 Historia Langobardorum codicis Gothani (9th century)
 Edictum Rothari (643 AD)

In 2006, Emilia Denčeva argued that the inscription of the Pernik sword may be Lombardic.

Runic
There are two short inscriptions in the Elder Futhark which are regarded as Lombardic.

The Schretzheim bronze capsule, from 540–590:
 On the lid: 
 On the bottom: 
Translation: "Arogis and Alaguth (and) Leuba made (it)"

The two fibulae from Bezenye, Hungary, from 510–590.
 Fibula A:  
 Fibula B:  
Translation: "Godahi(l)d, (with) sympathy (I?) Arsiboda bless"

There is debate as to whether the inscription on the fifth-century Szabadbattyán belt buckle is Lombardic or Gothic, and the reading is uncertain. The futhark on the Breza half-column is regarded as either Lombardic or Alemannic.

Notes

References

Further reading

External links

Sources of Lombard history

Medieval languages
Germanic languages
Upper German languages
 
Extinct languages of Italy
Extinct Germanic languages